Liberty & Lament is Lucero's own record label. The label is a part of the EastWest Records family of labels.

Current Bands
Lucero
 Glossary

See also
 List of record labels

American record labels
Vanity record labels
Alternative rock record labels